The Bishop of Dunkeld is the ecclesiastical head of the Diocese of Dunkeld, one of the largest and more important of Scotland's 13 medieval bishoprics, whose first recorded bishop is an early 12th-century cleric named Cormac. However, the first known abbot dates to the 10th century, and it is often assumed that in Scotland in the period before the 12th century, the roles of both bishop and abbot were one and the same. The Bishopric of Dunkeld ceased to exist as a Catholic institution after the Scottish Reformation but continued as a royal institution into the 17th century. The diocese was restored (with a different boundary) by Pope Leo XIII on 4 March 1878; it is now based in the city of Dundee.

List of known abbots
Dunkeld Abbey was an offshoot of Iona, perhaps founded in the early 9th century, in the reign of Caustantín mac Fergusa, King of the Picts. It is not clear when its abbots got independence from the Abbots of Iona, but a notable event is the alleged transfer of the relics of Columba to Dunkeld during the reign of the Scoto-Pictish king Cináed mac Ailpín. Its abbots, like many Gaelic abbots of the period, took a strong role in secular affairs, hence the term "lay abbot". The following is a list of known abbots of Dunkeld; the list is not exhaustive.

While it is true that medieval churchmen took an active part in secular affairs (some fought in battles), that didn't make them in any sense "lay."  They were still consecrated bishops or abbots.  A "lay abbot" was the secular lord of the abbey's lands. Since an abbey's property was often extensive, it was lucrative plum.  Medieval monarchs enjoyed considerable authority over the church, and doubtless, these positions were awarded to royal favorites.

List of known pre-Reformation bishops
The Bishopric of Dunkeld was one of the largest in medieval Scotland. However, in 1200, half of its territory was used to create the new Bishopric of Argyll.

List of Schism anti-bishops

List of post-Reformation bishops

Church of Scotland succession
In 1560 the Church of Scotland broke its ties with Rome.

Scottish Episcopal Church succession

Roman Catholic succession
The Bishop of Dunkeld is the Ordinary of the Catholic Diocese of Dunkeld in the Province of Saint Andrews and Edinburgh. The diocese covers an area of 9,505 km².  The see is in the City of Dundee where the seat is located at the Cathedral Church of Saint Andrew. The post Reformation diocese was restored by Pope Leo XIII on 4 March 1878.  The Right Reverend Stephen Robson is the 9th bishop of the diocese since its restoration.

(Any dates appearing in italics indicate de facto  continuation of office.  The start date of tenure below is the date of appointment or succession. Where known, the date of installation and ordination as bishop are listed in the notes together with the post held prior to appointment.)

See also
Anglican Diocese of Saint Andrews, Dunkeld and Dunblane

Notes

References
 Broun, Dauvit, "Dunkeld and the origin of Scottish identity", in Innes Review 48 (1997), pp. 112–124, reprinted in Spes Scotorum: Hope of Scots, eds. Broun and Clancy (1999), pp. 95–111.
 Dowden, John, The Bishops of Scotland, ed. J. Maitland Thomson, (Glasgow, 1912)
 Hudson, Benjamin T., "Kings and Church in Early Scotland", in The Scottish Historical Review''', Vol. 73, (October, 1994), pp. 145–70
 Watt, D.E.R., Fasti Ecclesiae Scotinanae Medii Aevi ad annum 1638, 2nd Draft, (St Andrews, 1969)
 Keith, Robert, An Historical Catalogue of the Scottish Bishops,'' Edinburgh, 1824,  pp. 99,100

External links
 Annals of Ulster
 Translation
Dauvit Broun's list of 12th century Scottish Bishops

 Bishop of Dunkeld
Christianity in Dundee